Eren Beyaz (born October 1, 1985) is a Turkish professional basketball player for Denizli Basket.

References

External links
Profile at tblstat.net 
Profile at tbl.org.tr 

1985 births
Living people
Aliağa Petkim basketball players
Beşiktaş men's basketball players
Beykozspor basketball players
Centers (basketball)
Darüşşafaka Basketbol players
Galatasaray S.K. (men's basketball) players
People from Şişli
Basketball players from Istanbul
Turkish men's basketball players